The 1942 Memphis State Tigers football team was an American football team that represented Memphis State College (now known as the University of Memphis) as an independent during the 1942 college football season. In their first season and season under head coach Lefty Jamerson, the Tigers compiled a 2–7 record.

Schedule

References

Memphis State
Memphis Tigers football seasons
Memphis State Tigers football